Haileybury, formally Haileybury and Imperial Service College, is an academically selective, co-educational public school (English independent boarding and day school) for 11- to 18-year-olds near Hertford in England. It is a member of the Rugby Group and enrols pupils at the 11+, 13+ and 16+ stages of education. Over 890 pupils attend Haileybury, of whom more than 550 board.

Academic 
Haileybury was judged 'Excellent in all areas' in its 2022 Inspection Report by the Independent Schools Inspectorate (ISI).

The school offers a dedicated Lower School for years 7 and 8 and a wide range of GCSEs and IGCSEs. In the Sixth Form, pupils can select to study for A levels or the International Baccalaureate (IB) diploma.

In 2022, 90% of A Level/IB grades were awarded at A*-B, or the equivalent.

Facilities 
More than two-thirds of pupils are boarders and school life is centred around 12 boarding houses, Lower School benefitting from having their own house called Highfield. The six boys' houses consist of Bartle Frere, Batten, Edmonstone, Kipling, Thomason, and Trevelyan. These former boys' houses have been converted into girls' houses: Colvin, Lawrence, Melvill, Allenby, Alban's and Hailey. The Ayckbourn Theatre functions as a modern auditorium with a fully equipped stage and back-stage. In 1997, the college chapel organ was re-built by the German organ builder Klais.

In additional to the existing facilities, building is underway for a new science and technology centre, scheduled to open in the Autumn term 2023. Once completed, the new buildings will double the size of the school’s current provision. The new buildings will include new science laboratories, the latest IT suites and, robotics and DT facilities. It will also feature twenty interconnected teaching and seminar spaces and an outdoor courtyard.

Model United Nations 
Haileybury hosts its own Model United Nations Conference every year, for over a thousand pupils, making it largest MUN conference in the UK. The conference is typically held the weekend before the Easter holiday.

History 

The previous institution to occupy the Haileybury site was the East India College (EIC), the training establishment founded in 1806 for administrators of the East India Company. The EIC was initially based at Hertford Castle, but substantial grounds in Hertford Heath were acquired for future development. William Wilkins, the architect of Downing College, Cambridge, and the National Gallery in London, was appointed principal architect. The buildings compose four ranges which enclose an area known as Quad, the second-largest academic quadrangle in Britain after Christ Church, Oxford. In the wake of the Indian Rebellion of 1857, the East India Company was nationalised, and its College closed in January 1858.

In 1862, a public school opened on the site, with royal charter being received in 1864.

The Chapel dome was added by Sir Arthur Blomfield and completed in 1877. Further Victorian additions were designed by Sir John William Simpson. The Memorial Hall, the school's dining hall, was opened by the future King George VI and Queen Elizabeth, and acts as a monument to former pupils who gave their lives in the First World War. During the past 40 years, its use has been extended to commemorate deaths of OHs in all military conflicts.

The dining hall contains one of the largest unsupported domes in Europe. Until the 1990s, the entire school of over 700 pupils dined there at a single sitting, all brought to silence for grace by the beating of a massive brass howitzer shell, captured from a German gun emplacement during the First World War and then converted into a gong. A gilded plaster boss in the centre of this dome represents an oak tree being struck by lightning. Known as Little Lightning Oak, this decoration represents the massive oak tree that stands on the lawn in front of Terrace, the promenade visible in this photograph. This tree was struck by lightning and, all but destroyed, re-sprouted.

As well as the wooden tablets surrounding the exterior of the dining hall, there are other memorials to the school's 1,436 war casualties. In memory of Haileyburians who died in the Boer War, a war memorial obelisk, of Portland stone with bronze decorations by Charles Wellington Furse, former pupil, was erected on the main axis of the school's entrance front in 1903; it was designed by another former pupil, Sir Reginald Blomfield. Also designed by Sir Reginald is the memorial on Terrace, originally built to commemorate those lost in the First World War; it was unveiled by General Sir Alexander Godley on 7 July 1923. Known as the Cross of Sacrifice, this simple stone structure serves as a prototype for war memorials found in every Commonwealth War Cemetery and other war memorials around the world.

Seventeen former pupils of Haileybury and its antecedents have received the Victoria Cross, and three the George Cross. Amongst public schools whose pupils have been awarded the Victoria Cross, Haileybury is in the top three, alongside Eton and Harrow.

In 1942, Haileybury and the Imperial Service College (which had itself subsumed the United Services College) merged to become Haileybury and Imperial Service College, now referred to simply as Haileybury.

In the late 20th century, reforming headmaster David Jewell took charge of Haileybury, bringing it out of its post-Cold War austerity. Stuart Westley, Master of Haileybury until July 2009, was responsible for making the school fully co-educational.

Related schools

Haileybury Almaty 

In 2006/2007, Haileybury advised on the building of a Haileybury in Almaty, Kazakhstan where all English GCSEs are taught and the curriculum is taught similarly under the guidance of Haileybury. The school, opened in September 2008, is known as Haileybury Almaty.

The pupils are made up mostly of Kazakhstan citizens. They are all required to speak English. The academic year 2010–11 saw the first batch of pupils pass their IGCSE exams. Since August 2011, Haileybury Almaty has opened a sixth form. In 2016, 11 pupils graduated from the sixth form, with one getting admission to Trinity College, Cambridge University, and 6 securing places at University College, London (UCL). A second school, in the Kazakhstan capital, Nur-Sultan, was opened in September 2011.

Haileybury Astana 

Following the foundation of Haileybury Almaty, a sister school was opened in 2008 in Nur-Sultan, the capital city of Kazakhstan. Haileybury Astana provides education for boys and girls from the two to eighteen years of age and introduced the IB and joined CIS and NEASC under the leadership of Headmaster John Coles. It is an IB World School and started running the International Primary Curriculum (IPC) at the same time. The school passed its first successful COBIS inspection in 2018 where the school was rated as having top international practice in 17 out of 19 areas.

The School has grown rapidly since it was opened by the President of Kazakhstan. In 2017, the new IB Centre was opened by the Minister of Education. By 2020, the school had close to 650 pupils.

Haileybury Turnford 

In September 2015, Turnford School in Turnford, Hertfordshire converted to academy status and was renamed Haileybury Turnford. Haileybury acts as the main sponsor of the school. This is the first state-funded school to have links with Haileybury.

Notable former pupils 
Past pupils are known as Old Haileyburians.

For details of notable alumni, see List of people educated at Haileybury and Imperial Service College.

References

External links

 Haileybury web site

1862 establishments in England
Arthur Blomfield buildings
Boarding schools in Hertfordshire
Educational institutions established in 1862
International Baccalaureate schools in England
Member schools of the Headmasters' and Headmistresses' Conference
Racquets venues
Schools cricket
Schools with a royal charter
Church of England private schools in the Diocese of St Albans
Gardens by Humphry Repton
Haileybury and Imperial Service College
Private schools in Hertfordshire